Ruyi Masood Textile Park is an integrated industrial-textile park located in M-3 Industrial Estate in Faisalabad, Punjab province of Pakistan.

References

Buildings and structures in Faisalabad
Industrial parks in Pakistan